Tollesbury Pier railway station was a short-lived terminus of an extension of the Kelvedon and Tollesbury Light Railway, serving Tollesbury's pier on the River Blackwater in Essex. The station was opened in 1907.

During World War I the pier was used for troop training on the river and was subsequently closed to passengers in 1921. The government took over the pier during World War II and erected defences along it.

References

External links
 1945 O. S. map showing line extending to Tollesbury Pier, but with station no longer marked having closed in 1921.

Disused railway stations in Essex
Former Great Eastern Railway stations
Railway stations in Great Britain opened in 1907
Railway stations in Great Britain closed in 1921